The Customs and Excise Extra Guards Association is a trade union in Trinidad and Tobago which represents Extra Guards in the Customs and Excise Division of the Ministry of Finance.

See also

 List of trade unions

Trade unions in Trinidad and Tobago
Civil service trade unions